The 1988 Wirral Metropolitan Borough Council election took place on 5 May 1988 to elect members of Wirral Metropolitan Borough Council in England. This election was held on the same day as other local elections.

After the election, the composition of the council was:

Election results

Overall election result

Overall result compared with 1987.

Ward results

Bebington

Bidston

Birkenhead

Bromborough

Clatterbridge

Claughton

Eastham

Egerton

Heswall

Hoylake

Leasowe

Liscard

Moreton

New Brighton

Oxton

Prenton

Royden

Seacombe

Thurstaston

Tranmere

Upton

Wallasey

Changes between 1988 and 1990

Notes

• italics denote the sitting councillor • bold denotes the winning candidate

References

1988 English local elections
1988
1980s in Merseyside